Capability Scotland is a Scottish charity founded in 1946. Based in Edinburgh with operations across Scotland, it provides care, support, and education for disabled people. The charity offers residential care homes, care at home, housing support, and specialised education through two schools.

History
Capability Scotland was founded on 31 October 1946 by a group of parents and health professionals. Its initial aim was to support children with cerebral palsy.

The first school was opened in Corstorphine, Edinburgh, in 1948. In the early 1960s, the charity began organising employment opportunities for disabled people, and in 1973 the first adult residential home was established.

Whilst the Edinburgh-based Westerlea School was closed in 2016, Capability Scotland operates two other specialist education schools; Stanmore House in Lanark and Corseford School in Kilbarchan.

A new project was established in 2021 to build a brand new residential care home in a new community development in Perth named Bertha Park. The charity aims to complete this by 2026.

Partnerships
Capability Scotland is a member of Disability Agenda Scotland together with Sense Scotland, ENABLE Scotland, RNIB Scotland, Action on Hearing Loss Scotland, and the Scottish Association for Mental Health.

See also
Anne Mathams
Cerebral palsy

References

External links
 Official website

Charities based in Edinburgh
Cerebral palsy organizations
1996 establishments in Scotland
Education in Scotland
Disability in the United Kingdom
Social care in Scotland
Disability rights organizations
Charities for disabled people based in Scotland
Social welfare charities based in Scotland
Educational charities based in the United Kingdom